Shaman Mithru (1978 – 17 June 2021) was an Indian film cinematographer and actor.

Career
After apprenticing under Ravi K. Chandran and K. V. Anand, Shaman began his career as the main cinematographer with the Telugu film Mouna Ragam (2010). Shaman then worked on the Tamil films Naran starring Poorna, and Ethiri En 3 starring Srikanth and Poonam Bajwa, that were shot between 2010 and 2011. Despite completing the shoot, neither film eventually had a theatrical release. During the period, he also worked as the cinematographer of a delayed Kannada language film titled Akhaada, which later gained notoriety for featuring actor Vijay Sethupathi in a lead role. Shaman later went on to shoot the Kannada film Huchudugaru (2014), for which he earned acclaim.

Shaman later turned producer and acted in the film, Thorati (2019), directed by P. Marimuthu. Mithru stated that the film's making and characterisations were along the lines of those seen in Paruthiveeran (2007), Subramaniyapuram (2008) and Vaagai Sooda Vaa (2011). Actors were trained for six months, and a mock shoot was held for five days before production had started. Set in the 1980s, the film told the tale of shepherds in rural Tamil Nadu, who walk miles in search of pasture for their goats and sheep. The makers screened the film at international film festivals, before the theatrical release in Tamil Nadu. In its review, the critic from The Times of India gave a positive impression and wrote the film "starts off as a lackadaisical narration [but] moves steadily once the major plot unfolds", adding that "the cinematography, which captures the village in all its beauty and the effortless performance from the heroine and the trio are positives of the film." The News Minute labelled it as "a simple romance drama engagingly told", while The New Indian Express wrote that it was a "tightly-knit emotional tale of love and loss". The film also garnered post-release after reports that the lead actress, Sathyakala, had been abducted. She later claimed that she did not attend press meets because she had fallen out with Shaman.

The relative success of Thorati prompted him to begin pre-production work on his next project.

Death
He died aged 43 in Chennai on 17 June 2021 due to COVID-19. He is survived by his wife Sakunthala and daughter Moksha.

Filmography
Mouna Ragam (2010) (as cinematographer)
Naran (unreleased) (as cinematographer)
Ethiri En 3 (unreleased) (as cinematographer)
Akhaada (unreleased) (as cinematographer)
Huchudugaru (2014) (as cinematographer)
Thorati (2019) (as actor and producer)

References

External links

1978 births
2021 deaths
Tamil actors
Tamil film producers
Film producers from Chennai
Deaths from the COVID-19 pandemic in India
Tamil film cinematographers
Kannada film cinematographers
Telugu film cinematographers
Male actors from Tamil Nadu
Cinematographers from Tamil Nadu
Male actors in Tamil cinema
People from Kanyakumari district